Sir Benjamin Ormerod (7 September 1890 – 21 September 1974) was a lawyer and Judge in England and Wales.

Ormerod was appointed a Justice of the Probate, Divorce and Admiralty Division of the High Court of England and Wales on 25 May 1948. He was knighted a few days later. Ormerod was transferred to the Queen's Bench Division (known as the King's Bench Division until 1952) on 6 June 1950. He was promoted to be a Lord Justice of Appeal in the Court of Appeal of England and Wales on 21 January 1957. Following that appointment, Ormerod was made a member of the Privy Council of the United Kingdom. He retired from his judicial office on 30 September 1963.

Personal life
Sir Bernjamin Ormerod was born in Blackburn, Lancashire, served in Gallipoli and the Western Front. He married Kathleen May Carter in 1916 and had 2 daughters and a son.

Arms

References

 The Judges of England 1272-1990, by Sir John Sainty (Selden Society, 1993)

20th-century English judges
1890 births
Knights Bachelor
Lords Justices of Appeal
Probate, Divorce and Admiralty Division judges
Queen's Bench Division judges
Members of the Privy Council of the United Kingdom
1974 deaths